Niji Akanni is a Nigerian dramatist, screenwriter, director, producer and  filmmaker.

Education
Akanni received a Bachelor of Arts degree in Dramatic Arts from Obafemi Awolowo University and a master's degree in Film Studies from the University of Ibadan as well as a professional master's degree (MFA) in Screenplay Writing and Film Directing from the Film and Television Institute of India.

Career
He has scripted, co-scripted and directed several notable Nigerian films and reality shows.

As one of Nigeria's official three theatrical presentations at the 2012 Cultural Olympiad in London, he directed The Lion and the Jewel, a play by Nigerian writer, Professor Wole Soyinka that was first performed in 1959.
In 2005, he was Assistant Director of the first season of Amstel Malta Box Office, a Nigerian Reality Television Show.

In 2006, he was Content Director on Big Brother Nigeria, the same year he co-scripted, The Narrow Path, a 95 minutes film produced by Mainframe Films and Television Productions and directed by Tunde Kelani. The film, which featured Sola Asedeko and Khabirat Kafidipe was adapted from The Virgin, a debut novel of Bayo Adebowale.
In 2008, he directed Abobaku, a short film in Super-16mm gauge, produced by Femi Odugbemi on the MNET's New Directions project. Abobaku won several awards, including the Most Outstanding Short Film award at the 2010 ZUMA Film Festival in Abuja, Nigeria; Best Costume at the 6th Africa Movie Academy Awards held on 10 April 2010 at the Gloryland Cultural Center in Yenagoa, Bayelsa State, Nigeria; and was also judged Best Short Film at the 2010 TERRACOTA Awards in Lagos, Nigeria.

In 2010, he wrote and directed Aramotu, a Nigerian drama digital film that stars Gabriel Afolayan. The film received 7 nominations at the 7th Africa Movie Academy Awards and won the awards for Best Nigerian Film and Best Costume Design.
It also emerged as the Best Feature Film at Africa International Film Festival, held in Calabar in May 2013. Aramotu screened at various film festivals across the world, including the 2012 Samsung Women's International Film Festival (SWIFF) in Chennai, India; 2012 Africa In The Picture (AITP)film festival, Amsterdam; 2013 Arusha African International Film Festival (AIFF), Tanzania; and 2013 International Film Festival of Kerala (IFFK), India.

He scripted and directed Heroes and Zeros, a Nigerian drama film that stars Nadia Buari, Bimbo Manuel, Gabriel Afolayan, Linda Ejiofor and Olu Jacobs. 
The film was released on September 7, 2012 and  premiered in the UK on March 15, 2013 at Odeon Cinema.
The film won the Most Outstanding Film and Audience Choice awards at the 2013 EKO International Film Festival and competed in the digital film category of the 2013 Pan African Film and Television Festival, FESPACO, in Ouagadougou, Burkina Faso. It was invited to the 2013 International Film Festival of Kerala, IFFK, in India, and was also screened at the 2014 Afrikamera Film Festival in Warsaw, Poland.  It received 6 nominations at the 9th Africa Movie Academy Awards and  won the awards for  Best Editing, Best Screenplay and Best Director

Filmography

Accolades
The table below highlight the awards and nominations received by Niji Akanji and his films.

See also
 List of Nigerian film producers

References

Nigerian film directors
Nigerian film producers
Nigerian screenwriters
Nigerian dramatists and playwrights
Obafemi Awolowo University alumni
Yoruba-language film directors
Yoruba filmmakers
Yoruba dramatists and playwrights
University of Ibadan alumni
1962 births
Living people
People from Ogun State